Dryobalanops aromatica, commonly known as Borneo camphor, camphor tree, Malay camphor, or Sumatran camphor, is a species of critically endangered plant in the family Dipterocarpaceae. The species name aromatica is derived from Latin (aromaticus meaning spice-like) and refers to the smell of the dammar (resin). This species was one of the main sources of camphor and attracted early Arab traders to Borneo, at that time being worth more than gold, and used for incense and perfumes.

It is found in Sumatra, peninsular Malaysia, and Borneo.

It is a large emergent tree, up to 65 m or even 75 m tall, found in mixed dipterocarp forests on deep humic yellow sandy soils. It is a heavy hardwood sold under the trade names of  Kapur. It is recorded from at least two protected areas (Lambir and Gunung Mulu National Parks).

Bergenin, malaysianol A, laevifonol, ampelopsin E, α-viniferin, ε-viniferin and diptoindonesin A can be isolated from the stem bark of D. aromatica.

Dryobalanops aromatica is one of several tree species known to exhibit a behavior called crown shyness.

References

aromatica
Trees of Sumatra
Trees of Peninsular Malaysia
Trees of Borneo
Flora of Sabah
Critically endangered flora of Asia